Robert Charles Holly, Jr. (born June 1, 1960) is a former American football quarterback in the National Football League (NFL) for the Washington Redskins, Philadelphia Eagles and Atlanta Falcons.  He played college football at Princeton University.

Born and raised in Clifton, New Jersey, Holly attended Clifton High School.

He attracted the attention of NFL scouts at Princeton in 1981 when he set a school record by throwing for 501 yards against Yale, and scoring the go-ahead touchdown on a keeper himself late in the game in a 35–31 victory, Princeton's first over arch-rival Yale since 1966.  That year, he set a school record (since broken) by throwing for 2,668 yards, and was named first-team All-Ivy.

He was drafted in the 11th round by the Redskins in 1982, and served as the backup to Joe Theisman that season, in which the Redskins won the Super Bowl.  He played in 5 regular season games for the Redskins in 1983, completing his only pass attempt, and he appeared in one playoff game, completing the two passes he attempted.

He was a member of the Philadelphia Eagles and Atlanta Falcons in 1984, but did not appear in any games.  He played in four games for the Falcons in 1985, completing 24 of 39 passes for 295 yards and one touchdown.

He was injured in a car accident in the off-season after the 1985 season, and retired from pro football.

References

1960 births
Living people
American football quarterbacks
Washington Redskins players
Philadelphia Eagles players
Atlanta Falcons players
Princeton Tigers football players
Players of American football from New Jersey
Clifton High School (New Jersey) alumni
Sportspeople from Clifton, New Jersey